The 2006 12 Hours of Sebring was the 54th running of this event, and took place on March 18, 2006.  The race was sponsored by Mobil 1 and was the opening race of the 2006 American Le Mans Series season run by IMSA.

This race marked the first time that a diesel powered racing vehicle had won a major endurance sports car race, with Audi taking the victory in their new R10 TDI sportscar, which was also the car's first race ever.  However the win was not without problems, as one of the two Audi R10s suffered overheating problems and did not finish.  This victory would be a building block towards the diesel R10 winning the marquis ACO event the 2006 24 Hours of Le Mans and taking 36 class wins in 48 career races entered.

Liz Halliday's second place overall is the best for any woman in the history of the 12 Hours of Sebring as of December 2012.

Official results

Class winners in bold.  Cars failing to complete 70% of winner's distance marked as Not Classified (NC).

Statistics
 Pole Position - #2 Audi Sport North America - 1:45.828
 Fastest Lap - #2 Audi Sport North America - 1:48.373
 Distance - 
 Average Speed -

External links
 

Sebring
12 Hours of Sebring
12 Hours Of Sebring
12 Hours Of Sebring